Mall of the Emirates is a shopping mall in Dubai. Developed and owned by Majid Al Futtaim Group, it opened in November 2005 and is located at interchange four on Sheikh Zayed Road.

The multi-level shopping mall currently features more than 630 retail outlets, 7900 parking spaces, over 100 restaurants and cafés, 80 luxury stores and 250 flagship stores. It has a total gross leasable area of 255,489 square meters. It also hosts family leisure activities including Ski Dubai (the Middle East's first indoor ski resort and snow park), the 500-seat capacity Dubai Community Theatre and Arts Centre and Magic planet, one of the largest indoor family entertainment centers in Dubai.

In November 2005, it was named the World's Leading New Shopping Mall at the World Travel Awards in London. In 2017, Forbes named Mall of the Emirates as one of the top five shopping malls in Dubai.

Construction and history
The project was launched in October 2003 at an estimated cost of AED 800 million (US$218 million), and was scheduled to be completed in September 2005. The architecture in the three-storey complex combines Arabic and Mediterranean elements, with each level connected to a car park.

The mall was designed by the American architectural firm F+A Architects. The main building contract was handled by Khansaheb, while the Ski Dubai contract was given to Pomagalski. The chair lifts in the snow park and the structural steel works were handled by Emirates Building System and the piling by Bauer.

The mall opened for business on 28 September 2005 with an official inauguration in November.

Milestones

 September 2005 – Mall of the Emirates opens
 November 2005 – Opening of Ski Dubai, the Middle East's first indoor ski resort and snow park
 April 2006 – Kempinski opens hotel at the mall
 September 2008 – mall announces expansion to increase facilities for shopping, dining and parking
 September 2009 – completion of metro link to mall from the Red Line of the Dubai Metro
 August 2010 – launch of Fashion Dome
 2012 – ranked the 7th most productive shopping center in the world, earning US$1,423 per square foot per annum, according to research by the International Council of Shopping Centres (ICSC)
 June 2013 – Mall of the Emirates announces Evolution 2015, a multi-stage AED 1 billion redevelopment project
 May 2014 – Mall of the Emirates changes their logo
 September 2015 – Mall of the Emirates opened the new expansion on Level 2.

Shopping
Shops at the mall include a Carrefour hypermarket, Centrepoint, Debenhams, Harvey Nichols, Home Centre, Jashanmal and Marks & Spencer.

Entertainment
The mall also hosts a number of family leisure offerings. These include the Magic Planet family entertainment area, a 20-screen VOX Cinema, Ski Dubai, and the Dubai Community Theatre and Arts Centre.

Ski Dubai

Ski Dubai is a large indoor skiing facility at Mall of the Emirates, offering snowboarding, ski lessons, children's play area and cafe. It opened in November 2005 and houses the world's largest indoor snow park. It is operated by Majid Al Futtaim Leisure & Entertainment.

Dubai Community Theatre and Arts Centre

Dubai Community Theatre and Arts Centre (DUCTAC) is a non-profit, cross-community creative centre that opened in November 2006, under the patronage of Princess Haya bint Hussein. There were two-level theatre and rehearsal spaces, along with an arts centre housing galleries, classrooms, studios, music school, library and high specification visual arts gallery.

In July 2018, Dubai Community Theatre & Arts Centre (DUCTAC) closed at the Mall of the Emirates.

VOX Cinemas

VOX Cinemas has a 14-screen multiplex cinema at Mall of the Emirates, including 2 VOX Gold screens. VOX Cinemas is owned and operated by Majid Al Futtaim Cinemas. It is located in the new expansion area at Mall of the Emirates level 2 and consists of 24- screens including an IMAX with Laser theatre, Vox Kids, 4DX Cinema and Theatre by Rhodes.

Magic Planet
Magic Planet is an indoor family entertainment centre with two entertainment zones for children and young adults. It has a ten-pin bowling alley with 12 lanes, pool and billiard tables, 180 amusement machines, and other attractions including a carousel, racing simulators, Jumping Star, soft play and bumper cars. It also includes the RoboCoaster (a two-person thrill ride unique to the Middle East) and XD Dark Ride, a "7D" adventure with 3D movie graphics and 4D effects including motion, wind and light.

Dining
The mall has over 100 restaurants and cafes including eight restaurants in the Fashion Dome:
 Two international food courts
 Restaurants including St. Maxim's, Salmontini, Karam Beirut and Apres and Sezzam on the first floor
 UAE's African-themed diner Tribes at the Fashion Dome
 Häagen-Dazs café
 12 new dining options on Level 2 including Omina Baharat, 800 Degrees Neapolitana Pizzeria, Dean & Deluca, Eat Greek Kouzina, Din Tai Fung, Azkadenya, Texas De Brazil & Common Grounds.
 The Cheesecake Factory, American restaurant
 Al Halabi – Lebanese restaurant
 P.F Chang's – American Chinese restaurant
 Miu Shanghai Tea House and Restaurant offers nosh from Japan, China, Thailand and Indonesia.
 YO! Sushi – conveyor belt sushi

Hotels
Mall of the Emirates has 2 Hotels connected to the Mall which includes, Kempinski Hotel Mall of the Emirates and Sheraton Mall of the Emirates Hotel.

Expansion
Mall of the Emirates’ AED 1 billion multi-stage redevelopment project, Evolution 2015, was completed in September 2015. The new Fashion District featuring 30 contemporary brands marked the completion of Phase 1. Phase 2 has added a second taxi rank located next to Ski Dubai on level 4. Phase 3, unveiled a new retail extension on Level 2 – an additional 36,000sqm of retail space added to include 40 new retailers.

On 10 September 2013, Mall of the Emirates announced a multi-stage redevelopment project worth an estimated AED 1 billion (US$274 million), which is called as Evolution 2015. Phase one of the project which will increase 5,000 sqm area more is already completed but expected to open in mid-2015 includes new shopping, dining and entertainment concepts. However, due to the limitations of its location, the mall will be expanded upwards by constructing a second floor on top of the Carrefour area.

On 25 August 2014, Mall of the Emirates announced phase two of its strategic redevelopment project, Evolution 2015 which is now currently underway. This project includes an additional of 1300 new spaces for car parking, 12 new restaurants, new prayer rooms for both, men and women and the relocation of the current VOX Cinemas which will now have 24 screens.

On 30 September 2015, David Beckham visited the mall for the inauguration of the Adidas store which was built in the newly expanded section.

Gallery

References

External links

 

Shopping malls established in 2005
Shopping malls in Dubai